Pantelamprus staudingeri is a moth in the family Xyloryctidae. It was described by Hugo Theodor Christoph in 1882. It is found in south-eastern Siberia and Japan.

References

Xyloryctidae
Moths described in 1882